Events from the year 1909 in Sweden

Incumbents
 Monarch – Gustaf V
 Prime Minister - Arvid Lindman

Events
 6–14 February – The Nordic Games take place in Stockholm.
 4 August to 4 September – Swedish General Strike (The Great Strike of 1909)
 Introduction of the 8-hour day at the end of 1910s
 10 December – Selma Lagerlöf becomes the first woman to be given the Nobel Prize in Literature.
 The right for women to vote in municipal elections are extended to include married women, and women are made eligible to municipal councils.
 The phrase "Swedish man" is removed from the application forms to public offices and women are thereby approved as applicants to most public professions.

Births

 12 January – Barbro Alving, reporter  (died 1987)

Deaths

 1 January – Ivar Arosenius, painter  (born 1878) 
 Elsa Borg, social worker  (born 1826) 
 Hanna Hammarström, industrialist  (born 1829)

References

 
Years of the 20th century in Sweden